Logan Craig O'Brien (born January 21, 1992) is an American child actor and singer. O'Brien is best known for his role as Lucas Jones on General Hospital.

Life and career
O'Brien was born in Los Angeles, California, to a doctor mother and a police sergeant father. He started his career at the age of six, after being cast in his first feature film role in the independent film Special Delivery, starring Sean Young, Penny Marshall and Nell Carter. He followed that up with co-starring roles in Disney's Smart House, and Hallmark Hall of Fame'''s A Season for Miracles, with Laura Dern and Lynn Redgrave. He also appeared in a duet entitled "Younger Generation" with singer Joey Pearson on his album Something to Say in 2002.

He has been involved in many theatrical productions, earning awards and nominations for his performances, and was seen in the ABC primetime pilot sitcom That Was Then. In 2005, O'Brien completed filming his part in the Universal Studios feature film Serenity'', directed by Joss Whedon, which premiered worldwide September 30, 2005.

Filmography

Award nominations

References

External links
Logan O'Brien Official Website

1992 births
American male child actors
American child singers
American male film actors
American male television actors
Living people
Male actors from Los Angeles
21st-century American singers